The 1958 Sterlington Railroad Disaster was a head-on collision by two Erie Railroad trains on August 11, 1958 at 6:47 AM killing 5 people and injuring 22 to 36 (sources are conflicting). The collision occurred when the operator in the signal tower at Suffern failed to hold the westbound train No. 53 at Suffern for the eastbound No. 50 commuter train from Monroe, New York, to Hoboken, New Jersey. When he realized his error, he attempted to contact the crews via radio but was unsuccessful due to a radio dead spot. The trains impacted head-on right in front of the now abandoned Erie Railroad depot in Sterlington, New York near Sloatsburg, killing the crew of the locomotive No. 859 from train No.50 as well as two passengers and injuring the crew of the locomotive No. 1402 from the westbound train.

Accident 
Train No. 50, an eastbound passenger train was led by an American Locomotive Company PA-1 diesel-electric locomotive No. 859, with four passenger coaches. Beginning its day at 5:25 a.m. at Monroe, New York. Meanwhile, train No. 53, a westbound train headed for Port Jervis, New York with an EMD GP7 locomotive No. 1402, a road-switcher, an express car, mail car, mail-bagger car and two passenger coaches departed Hoboken Terminal in Hoboken, New Jersey at 4:00 am.

At 5:15 am, the train dispatcher at Hoboken was notified by the New Jersey operator that an eastbound freight train, Extra 703 East, would be coming off the Graham Line with three diesel-electric locomotives, 115 freight cars and a caboose. In order to keep the freight train moving and not delay train No. 50, they moved the freight train onto the eastbound track, switching to westbound track at Hillburn. The dispatcher informed the New Jersey operator at 5:16 by telephone to hold westbound trains and put a stop signal up. The freight was placed on the eastbound main track when it passed New Jersey at 5:28 am, going about 25 miles per hour.

Train No. 50 saw the stop signal at New Jersey, and a yellow flag, which noted that the operator had a Form 19 train order to let the freight through; the engineer of train No. 50 sounded the horn and a train order No. 103 was given by the New Jersey operator. Order 103 meant that train 50 could use the westbound main track between New Jersey, and the first crossover track west of Hillburn, and had priority over other trains. Train 50 crossed the interlocking station at 5:32 am, making stops at Southfields, Tuxedo and Sloatsburg.

As train No. 50 approached what was to become the scene of the accident, the engineer and a fireman and a road foreman were sitting the cab of locomotive 859 while the conductor, front brakeman and a flagman were located in the first coach of the train; the road foreman noted that after they departed Sloatsburg, they had seen train 53 coming up the line, but could not distinguish which track it was on because of the curve and vegetation alongside the tracks. When the road foreman and fireman saw train 53 on the westbound track, they notified the brakeman, who reduced the speed from 50 miles per hour 20 miles per hour Meanwhile, the engineer and the fireman entered the engine compartment of locomotive 859.

On train 53, the crew was divided between cars; the engineer and his colleagues were in control of locomotive 1402, which was now running on the westbound main line track north of Hillburn. The headlights were also dimmed on locomotive 1402. With no hold order for them, they continued on the westbound tack. when the engineer of 1402 saw the oncoming train, the emergency brakes were activated.

The two trains collided in front of the freight depot of the Erie Railroad in the hamlet of Sterlington. The two engines were described as being welded together from the force of the impact by officials responding to the scene, while several of the coaches on train No. 50 crashed into each other, pulling their wheels off the track. However, neither the locomotives or the cars behind them derailed.

Aftermath 
The case was ruled to be caused by human error and the signalman Frederick Roth was cleared of culpable negligence charges and was laid off in September

References 

Erie Railroad
Railway accidents and incidents in New York (state)
1958 disasters in the United States
Rockland County, New York